Julie Pontoppidan (born 28 August 1996) is a Danish handball player who currently plays for french league club Handball Club Celles-sur-Belle.

She used to play for Aarhus United.

Achievements 
Danish Cup
Bronze Medalist: 2017 (with Aarhus United)

References
 

1996 births
Living people
Danish female handball players
Sportspeople from Aarhus